The States and the Nation series is a book series published in celebration of the United States Bicentennial by W. W. Norton & Company regarding the states of the United States of America. The first volume was published in 1975 and volumes continued to appear until 1984.

Volumes
 Alabama, Virginia Van der Veer Hamilton.
 Alaska, William R. Hunt.
 Arizona, Lawrence Clark Powell.
 Arkansas, Harry S. Ashmore.
 California, David Lavender.
 Colorado, Marshall Sprague.
 Connecticut, David Morris Roth.
 Delaware, Carol E. Hoffecker.
 District of Columbia, David L. Lewis.
 Florida, Gloria Jahoda.
 Georgia, Harold H. Martin.
 Hawaii, Ruth M. Tabrah.
 Idaho, F. Ross Peterson.
 Illinois, Richard J. Jensen.
 Indiana, Howard Henry Peckham.
 Iowa, Joseph Frazier Wall.
 Kansas, Kenneth S. Davis.
 Kentucky, Steven A. Channing.
 Louisiana, Joe Gray Taylor.
 Maine, Charles E. Clark.
 Maryland, Carl Bode.
 Massachusetts, Richard D. Brown.
 Michigan, Bruce Catton.
 Minnesota, William E. Lass.
 Mississippi, John Ray Skates.
 Missouri, Paul C. Nagel.
 Montana, Clark C. Spence.
 Nebraska, Dorothy Weyer Creigh.
 Nevada, Robert Laxalt.
 New Hampshire, Elizabeth Forbes Morison.
 New Jersey, Thomas Fleming.
 New Mexico, Marc Simmons.
 New York, Bruce Bliven.
 North Carolina, William S. Powell.
 North Dakota, Robert P. Wilkins.
 Ohio, Walter Havighurst.
 Oklahoma, H. Wayne Morgan.
 Oregon, Gordon B. Dodds.
 Pennsylvania, Thomas C. Cochran.
 Rhode Island, William McLoughlin.
 South Carolina, Louis B. Wright.
 South Dakota, John R. Milton.
 Tennessee, Wilma Dykeman.
 Texas, Joe B. Frantz.
 Utah, Charles S. Peterson.
 Vermont, Charles T. Morrissey.
 Virginia, Louis D. Rubin, Jr.
 Washington, Norman H. Clark.
 West Virginia, J. A. Williams.
 Wisconsin, Richard Nelson Current.
 Wyoming, T. A. Larson.

External links
 Series: The States and the Nation

Series of history books